The Cassini space probe was deliberately disposed of via a controlled fall into Saturn's atmosphere on September 15, 2017, ending its nearly two-decade-long mission. This method was chosen to prevent biological contamination of any of the moons of Saturn now thought to offer potentially habitable environments. Factors that influenced the mission end method included the amount of rocket fuel left, the health of the spacecraft, and funding for operations on Earth.

Some possibilities for Cassini later stages were aerobraking into orbit around Titan, leaving the Saturn system, or making close approaches and/or changing its orbit. For example, it could have collected solar wind data in a heliocentric orbit.

End of mission options 

During planning for its extended missions, various future plans for Cassini were evaluated on the basis of scientific value, cost, and time. Some of the options examined included collision with Saturn atmosphere, an icy satellite, or rings; another was departure from Saturn orbit to Jupiter, Uranus, Neptune, or a centaur. Other options included leaving it in certain stable orbits around Saturn, or departure to a heliocentric orbit. Each plan required certain amounts of time and changes in velocity. Another possibility was aerobraking into orbit around Titan.

This table is based on page 19 of Cassini Extended Missions (NASA), from 2008.

Atmospheric entry and destruction 

On July 4, 2014, the Cassini science team announced that the proximal orbits of the probe would be named the "Grand Finale". This would be immediately preceded by a gradual shift in inclination to better view Saturn's polar hexagon, and a flyby of Enceladus to more closely study its cryovolcanism. This was followed by a dive into Saturn's atmosphere.

There was budgetary drama in 2013–14 about NASA receiving U.S. government funding for the Grand Finale. The two phases of the Grand Finale ended up being the equivalent of having two separate Discovery Program-class missions in that the Grand Finale was completely different from the main Cassini regular mission. The U.S. government in late 2014 approved the Grand Finale at the cost of $200 million. This was far cheaper than building two new probes in separate Discovery-class missions.

Scientific data was collected using eight of its twelve science instruments. All of the probe's magnetosphere and plasma science instruments, plus the spacecraft's radio science system, and its infrared and ultraviolet spectrometers collected data during the final plunge. The data rates flowing back from Saturn could not support imaging during the final plunge, so all pictures were downlinked (transmitted back to Earth) and cameras were switched off, before the final plunge began.

Cassinis final transmissions were received by the Canberra Deep Space Communication Complex, located in Australia at 18:55:46 AEST. In a bittersweet ending for the scientists involved, some of whom had been involved in the mission for decades, data was received for 30 seconds longer than anticipated, and the spacecraft's ultimate demise was predicted to have occurred within 45 seconds after that. Homages were paid on social media.  NASA's video won an Emmy for "Outstanding Original Interactive Program".

See also 
 Deliberate crash landings on extraterrestrial bodies
 Timeline of Cassini–Huygens

References

Further reading

External links 
 Cassini-Huygens at ESA
 Cassini-Huygens main page at NASA
 Cassini Mission Homepage by the Jet Propulsion Laboratory
 Cassini-Huygens Mission Profile by NASA's Solar System Exploration
 Grand Finale Overview at NASA

Cassini–Huygens
Spacecraft endings
Extraterrestrial atmosphere entry
2017 in spaceflight